Bobby Samaria (born 21 February 1970) is a Namibian football manager and former player who manages Namibia.

Playing career
Born in Grootfontein, Samaria began his career in the youth ranks of Chief Santos. At the age of 17, Samaria made his senior footballing debut for Eleven Arrows. After four years at Eleven Arrows, Samaria joined Windhoek-based side Black Africa, winning the Player of the Year award in 1993.

Internationally, Samaria made eleven appearances for Namibia, scoring once in a 2–1 win against Malawi on 1 August 1998.

Managerial career
Following his retirement from football, Samaria took up the managerial role at former club Black Africa. On 27 February 2006, Samaria resigned from the club, whilst still managing the Namibia under-20 side. In 2008, Samaria was appointed manager of African Stars. Samaria helped African Stars to win the 2008–09 and 2009–10 editions of the Namibia Premier League, as well as the 2010 Namibia FA Cup. In 2012, Samaria joined United Africa Tigers, winning the Namibia Super Cup, before returning to African Stars in 2015. In 2018, African Stars achieved the double of the Namibia Premier League and Namibia Super Cup. At the end of the 2018–19 season, Samaria left the club, with former Namibian international Robert Nauseb replacing him. In December 2018, following Nauseb's sacking, Samaria was re-appointed by African Stars. In 2019, Samaria was appointed by Namibia to manage the country during the 2020 African Nations Championship qualification.

Career statistics
Score and result list Namibia's goal tally first, score column indicates score after Samaria goal.

References

Living people
1970 births
Namibian men's footballers
Association football midfielders
Namibia international footballers
Eleven Arrows F.C. players
Black Africa S.C. players
Namibian football managers
Namibia national football team managers
People from Otjozondjupa Region